In a cumulative tale, sometimes also called a chain tale, action or dialogue repeats and builds up in some way as the tale progresses. With only the sparest of plots, these tales often depend upon repetition and rhythm for their effect, and can require a skilled storyteller to negotiate their tongue-twisting repetitions in performance. The climax is sometimes abrupt and sobering as in "The Gingerbread Man."   The device often takes the form of a cumulative song or nursery rhyme. Many cumulative tales feature a series of animals or forces of nature each more powerful than the last.

History
Cumulative tales have a long pedigree. In an early Jewish Midrash, considered to date from the sixth century AD, Abraham is brought before King Nimrod, who commands him to worship fire. Abraham replies that it would be more reasonable to worship water, which can quench fire and is therefore more powerful. When this premise is granted, he points out that the clouds, as sustainers of water, are more worthy of worship, and then that the wind that disperses them is more powerful still. Finally he confronts Nimrod with the observation that "man can stand up against the wind or shield himself behind the walls of his house" (Genesis Rabba xxxviii).

There is a similar tale, The Mouse Turned into a Maid, in the Panchatantra, in which the mouse-maid is successively introduced to the sun, the cloud, the wind and the mountain. She prefers each in turn as stronger than the last, but finally a mouse is found to be stronger than even the mountain, and so she marries the mouse. Stories of this type, such as the Japanese The Husband of the Rat's Daughter, are widely diffused.

Classification
In the Aarne-Thompson classification system, types 2000–2100 are all cumulative tales, including:
Chains Based on Numbers, Objects, Animals, or Names 2000–2020
How the rich man paid his servant 2010 
The house is burned down 2014
The goat that would not go home 2015 
Fair Katrinelje and Pif-Paf-Poltrie 2019
Chains Involving Death 2021–2024
The cock and the hen 2021 
An Animal Mourns the Death of a Spouse 2022
Chains Involving Eating 2025–2028
 The Fleeing Pancake 2025
 The fat cat 2027
Chains Involving Other Events 2029–2075
 The Old Woman and Her Pig 2030
 The Sky Is Falling 2033 
 This Is the House That Jack Built 2035
 The Mouse Who Was to Marry the Sun 2031C (Japanese, Indian)
 Pulling up the turnip 2044 
 Tales in which animals talk 2075

Other examples of cumulative tales
 "The Death of the Little Hen"
 Why Mosquitoes Buzz in People's Ears
 The Fisherman and His Wife
 The Stonecutter
 Chad Gadya
 Green Eggs and Ham
 Drummer Hoff
 There Was an Old Lady Who Swallowed a Fly
 I Bought Me a Cat, featured in the 1950 Aaron Copland song set Old American Songs
 The Old Woman and the Pig
 The Train to Glasgow by Wilma Horsbrugh , later set to music by The Singing Kettle
 And The Green Grass Grew All Around
 Old MacDonald Had a Farm
 A Fly Went By
 Court of King Caractacus - song by Rolf Harris, later recorded by The Singing Kettle
 The Twelve Days of Christmas
 Green Grow the Rushes, O
 No News, or What Killed the Dog? by Nat M. Wills
 Fruit dropping on animal, then animal & fruit in conflict. (New Guinea)
 The Napping House, by Audrey Wood, 1984.
 Little John and Jacky French

See also

Cumulative song

Notes

Relevant literature
Cosbey, Robert C. "The Mak Story and Its Folklore Analogues." Speculum 20, no. 3 (1945): 310–317.
Masoni, Licia. "Folk Narrative and EFL: A Narrative Approach to Language Learning." Journal of Literature and Art Studies 8, no. 4 (2018): 640-658 
Ramanujan, Attippat Krishnaswami, Stuart H. Blackburn, and Alan Dundes. 1997. A Flowering Tree and Other Oral Tales from India, AK Ramanujan; Edited with a Preface by Stuart Blackburn and Alan Dundes. Univ of California Press.
Thomas, Joyce. "'Catch if you can': The cumulative tale." A companion to the fairy tale, ed by Hilda Roderick Ellis Davidson, Hilda Ellis Davidson, Anna Chaudhri, Derek Brewer.  Boydell & Brewer.  (2003): 123–136.
Voorhoeve, C. L. 2010. 408–415. A Remarkable Chain Tale from New Guinea. In Kenneth A. McElhanon and Ger Reesink.  A mosaic of languages and cultures: Studies celebrating the career of Karl J. Franklin.  SIL International.

External links
 The Old Woman and Her Pig from "English Fairy Tales" by Joseph Jacobs
 A shared chain story from three non-contiguous groups in Papua New Guinea

Folklore
Narrative forms
Poetic forms
ATU 2000-2199